Cantheschenia is a genus of filefishes native to the western Pacific Ocean.

Species
There are currently 2 recognized species in this genus:
 Cantheschenia grandisquamis Hutchins, 1977 (Large-scaled leatherjacket)
 Cantheschenia longipinnis Fraser-Brunner, 1941

References

Monacanthidae
Marine fish genera